Roger Westling (born 17 December 1961) is a Swedish biathlete. He competed at the 1984 Winter Olympics and the 1988 Winter Olympics.

References

1961 births
Living people
Swedish male biathletes
Olympic biathletes of Sweden
Biathletes at the 1984 Winter Olympics
Biathletes at the 1988 Winter Olympics
People from Dalarna
20th-century Swedish people